Jorge Eduardo Gil Pelicano (born 1977 in Figueira da Foz) is a Portuguese documentary filmmaker and television reporter, whose works feature economic and environmental impact issues, influence the global LGBT film community, and have been featured at international festivals including DOK Leipzig, Trento Film Festival, and CineEco.

Life

Pelicano studied Communications and Public Relations at the Polytechnic Institute of Guarda and Communications and Journalism at the Faculty of Arts at the University of Coimbra.

Career

Since 2001, he has been a freelance reporter for the television network, SIC. Pelicano is also known for his documentary films, including Ainda Há Pastores? (Are There Still Pastors), which premiered at the 2006 CineEco Film Festival and won an award there. It was the only Portuguese film selected for Brazil's Goiás film festival and won the Environmental Film Festival Network (EFFN) Green Award in Turin. In 2009, he released the award winning Pare, Escute, Olhe (Stop, Listen, Look), shown at Italy's Trento Film Festival. This film, which portrayed the economic development of Portgual's inland mountains, was one of the most watched Portuguese films in the first half of 2010. It received awards at both CineEco and Doclisboa. Pelicano's 2009 film Uma Vida Normal won the prize for Best Picture at the Festival International du Grand Reportage d'Actualité (FIGRA).

His 2018 film, Until Porn Do Us Part, which premiered at the Caminhos do Cinema, where it was awarded the Best Documentary and Audience Award. It also won the Best Documentary Award at Portugal's Sophia Awards, and was shown on national broadcaster, RTP. It also won Best Documentary at Amsterdam's Roze Filmdagen 2019.

Filmography
 2006: Ainda Há Pastores?
 2009: Pare, Escute, Olhe
 2014: Pára-me De Repente O Pensamento
 2015: The Last Analog Tree
 2018: Until Porn Do Us Part (Até Que o Porno Nos Separe)
2018: 4 Caminhos para Fátima
 2019: Tony

External links

References

1977 births
Living people
People from Figueira da Foz
Portuguese screenwriters
Male screenwriters
21st-century screenwriters
Portuguese cinematographers
Portuguese film directors